Villasimius, is a comune (municipality) in the Province of South Sardinia in the Italian region of Sardinia, located about  east of Cagliari.

History
Due to its strategically important site, Villasimius' territory was inhabited since prehistoric times, as testified by nuraghe (19th-6th centuries BC), Phoenician-Carthaginian (7th-2nd centuries BC) and Roman (3rd century BC-6th century AD) remains.

During the giudicati (Sardinian kingdoms), Aragonese and Spanish reigns, the territory suffered numerous pirate raids and became increasingly depopulated. The village name was, at least from the 13th century, Carbonara; this was repopulated from the early 19th century when it was under the Kingdom of Sardinia-Piedmont, becoming a comune in 1838. Villasimius' economy was traditionally based on agriculture and shepherding and, from 1875 to the extraction of granite. Its tourism industry began in the late 1960s and is now Villasimius' main economic activity.

In 1998 the Capo Carbonara National Marine Park was created. It encompasses all the waters surrounding the headlands in the eastern Gulf of Cagliari, from Villasimius' western border with Solanas, to its northern border with Castiadas.

Main sights

Beaches
The area's most important beaches  are Cala Burroni, Cala Caterina, Campus, Piscadeddus, Porto Giunco, Porto Sa Ruxi, Punta Molentis, Simius, Spiaggia del Riso, Timi Ama.

References

External links
Official website
Museo Archeologico, Ufficio Turistico e Servizi Culturali a Villasimius

Cities and towns in Sardinia